Caerwys is a town in Flintshire, Wales. It is just under two miles from the A55 North Wales Expressway and one mile from the A541 Mold-Denbigh road. At the 2001 Census, the population of Caerwys community was 1,315, with a total ward population of 2,496. Following reorganisation the community population fell at the 2011 Census to 1,283 with the ward raising to 2,569.  The community includes Afonwen.

History
Caerwys is mentioned in the Domesday Book as  a small market town. The well-maintained church is dedicated to St. Michael. It has two parallel naves. The oldest part of the building is a stone tower whose base is said to have been part of a Roman observation tower . Within the church is the cover slab of a tomb reputed to have been that of Elizabeth Ferrers, the wife of Dafydd ap Gruffudd, prince of Wales (d. 1283). A short, informative booklet about the church was written in 1936 and updated in 1995. As well as being surrounded by areas of outstanding natural beauty and views across mountains and valleys, the centre of Caerwys has been designated a conservation area.

In 1377 income from the Farm of Cayrouse was listed as part of the Principality issued to the Earl of Chester under the County Palatine of Chester, Caerwys being part of the Aticross Unhidated hundred.

In 1568 Queen Elizabeth I of England appointed a commission to control the activities of "minstrels, rhymers and bards", in Wales.  Simwnt Fychan was summoned to meet at Caerwys and was appointed "pencerdd", i.e. the senior bard.

Caerwys and Philadelphia have important historical connections. Local doctor, Thomas Wynne, sailed to America on the ship Welcome in 1682 with William Penn. Wynne was one of the founding fathers of Philadelphia and became the first speaker of the Provisional Assembly, as well as a provincial judge. The original street plan of Philadelphia was designed on the street pattern of Caerwys. Many Welsh names crop up in the city, and several buildings built in Philadelphia resemble buildings in the Caerwys area, some of which still stand today.

Caerwys hosted two of the most important eisteddfodau of the early modern era one in 1523, during the reign of Henry VIII of England at which Tudur Aled was present and the other, sanctioned by Elizabeth I, in 1568.

Notable people
 Thomas Wynne (1627 in Ysceifiog – 1692), physician to William Penn, settler of Philadelphia
 John Wynne (ca.1666 in Maes-y-coed – 1743), Bishop of St Asaph and of Bath and Wells 
 Thomas Jones of Denbigh (1756 at Penucha – 1820), writer and Methodist theologian.
 Angharad Llwyd (1780 at Caerwys - 1866), antiquary and prizewinner at the National Eisteddfod.
 Rowland Ellis (1841 in Caerwys – 1911), Bishop of Aberdeen and Orkney 
 Myfanwy Talog (1944 in Caerwys – 1995), actress and TV presenter with the BBC

Sport
The local football team Caerwys F.C. play in the Clwyd League. In the 2009/2010 season, they finished 3rd. They have a rivalry with many clubs including Holywell Town, Denbigh Town, and Ruthin Town. They also have a Summer League team and have a rivalry with Ysceifiog.

References

External links

Caerwys Town Council
Photos of Caerwys and surrounding area on geograph.org.uk

 
Towns in Flintshire
Communities in Flintshire